Ptychosperma gracile is a species of palm tree. It is endemic to Papua New Guinea, where it occurs in the Louisiade and Bismarck Archipelagoes. It grows in rainforests. It has declined due to the loss of habitat to agriculture.

References

gracile
Endemic flora of Papua New Guinea
Endangered plants
Taxonomy articles created by Polbot